Hans Maier (11 July 1916 – 29 November 2018) was a Dutch water polo player who competed in the 1936 Summer Olympics. Born in Madioen, Dutch East Indies, he was part of the Dutch team which finished fifth in the 1936 tournament, playing in all seven matches. He died in November 2018 at the age of 102.

References

Hans Maier's profile at Sports Reference.com

1916 births
2018 deaths
Dutch centenarians
Dutch male water polo players
Olympic water polo players of the Netherlands
People from Madiun
Water polo players at the 1936 Summer Olympics
Men centenarians
Dutch people of the Dutch East Indies
20th-century Dutch people